The French School at Athens (EfA;  Gallikí Scholí Athinón) is one of the seventeen foreign archaeological institutes operating in Athens, Greece.

History
Founded in 1846, the EfA is the oldest foreign institute in Athens. Its early foundation, still a source of considerable prestige, is to be seen culturally connected with French philhellenism and politically with the French East Mediterranean strategy of the time.

Facilities
It operates an active programme of research in all fields of Greek studies, but primarily in archaeology, epigraphy and Classical Studies. The EfA conducts an extensive programme of scholarships and bursaries. Its library holds 80,000 volumes, 550,000 photographs and 35,000 maps.

Educational institution
Unlike most of the other foreign institutes, the EfA has a status more akin to a university graduate school than a simple research institute. Its formal status is referred to as an Établissement public à caractère scientifique, culturel et professionnel in the French education system. Some of its sought-after scholarships are renewable for periods up to four years, providing students with the opportunity to conduct most or all of their PhD research in Athens.

Archaeological fieldwork
Since its foundation, the EFA has been involved in many important archaeological projects in Greece, including the excavations at Philippi, Dikili Tash (both in  Greek Macedonia),the  Samothrace temple complex and Thasos (in the North Aegean), Delphi (Central Greece), Argos (Peloponnese), Delos (Cyclades), Malia and Itanos (Crete), as well as Amathus in Cyprus.

Directors 

 Amédée Daveluy 1846-1867
 Émile-Louis Burnouf 1867-1875
 Albert Dumont 1875-1878
 Paul Foucart 1878-1890
 Théophile Homolle 1890-1903
 Maurice Holleaux 1903-1912
 Gustave Fougères 1913-1919
 Charles Picard 1919-1925
 Pierre Roussel 1925-1935
 Robert Demangel 1936-1950
 Georges Daux 1950-1969
 Pierre Amandry 1969-1981
 Olivier Picard 1981-1992
 Roland Étienne 1992-2001
 Dominique Mulliez 2002-2011
 Alexandre Farnoux 2011-2019
 Véronique Chankowski 2019-2023

Notable alumni
Many important archaeologists, classicists and epigraphers from France and elsewhere throughout a century and a half have been members of the EfA:

 Alexandre Bertrand (1849)
 Edmond About (1851)
 Numa-Denis Fustel de Coulanges (1853)
 Léon Heuzey (1854)
 Paul Vidal de la Blache (1867)
 Charles Diehl (1883)
 Victor Bérard (1887)
 Georges Daux (1920)
 André Plassart (1922)
 Louis Robert (1927)
 Paul Lemerle (1931)
 Ernest Will (1935)
 Jean Bousquet (1936)
 Maria Ludwika Bernhard (1938)
 Roland Martin (1938)
 Jean Pouilloux (1945)
 Jean Marcadé (1946)
 Pierre Lévêque (1947)
 Jean Bingen (1952)
 Edmond Lévy (1963)
 Michel Debidour (1972)
 Jean-Yves Empereur (1978)

Bibliography
G. Radet, L'histoire et l'œuvre de l'École française d'Athènes (History and the Works of École française d'Athènes), Paris, 1901. 
R. Étienne et al., L'Espace grec. Cent cinquante ans de fouilles de l'École française d'Athènes (Greek Space, A Hundred and Fifty Years of Excavation of the École française d'Athènes), Fayard, 1996.
E. Korka et al. (eds.): Foreign Archaeological Schools in Greece - 160 Years, Athens, Hellenic Ministry of Culture, 2006, p. 64-73.

External links

EfA Website
EfA Library Catalogue
Complete list of French members and former members of the EfA

Educational institutions established in 1846
Foreign Archaeological Institutes in Greece
1846 establishments in Greece